The Incheon Yi clan (Hangul: 인천 이씨, Hanja: 仁川 李氏) is a Korean clan. Historically known as the Gyeongwon Yi clan or Inju Yi clan, it was one of the most powerful clans in the early Goryeo period due their status as in-laws of the ruling House of Wang. According to the 2015 South Korean census, there were 83,855 members of this clan.

Name and Origin 
An ancestor of the clan, a 23rd generation descendant of King Suro and Heo Hwang-ok, was Heo Gi (許奇). He was sent to Tang China as an ambassador of Silla. Emperor Xuanzong bestowed the surname "Yi" on Heo Gi because he helped him escape from the An Lushan Rebellion. When Yi Heo Gi (李許奇) returned to Silla, King Gyeongdeok awarded him the title "Prince of Soseong" (邵城伯).

Later, Yi Heo-gyeom, a 10th generation descendant of Yi Heo Gi and the grandfather of Queen Wonseong, began the Incheon Lee clan.

Dominance in the Early Goryeo period 
The Gyeongwon Lee clan was thought to have been local aristocrats or hojok from Gyeongwon County (modern-day Incheon). The clan was able to use their marriage ties to the Ansan Kim clan, who were in-laws to the royal family, to become royal in-laws themselves. Yi Ja-yeon, the grandson of Heo-gyeom, married his three daughters to King Munjong. One of those three, Queen Inye, became the mother of three kings, Sunjong, Seonjong, and Sukjong.

From 981 to 1146, the Gyeongwon Lee clan had 27 officials in the central bureaucracy, 12 of whom were first or second grade officials. This was more than any other clan in during that time period. 

In 1095, Yi Ja-ui attempted to replace King Heonjong with his nephew, Wang Gyun. However, Prince Gyerim (later King Sukjong) and his allies killed Yi Ja-ui on  August 29, 1095 before it could happen.

See also 
 Yi Ja-gyeom

References

External links 
 
Clans based in Incheon
Korean clans